All Saints' Church in Bramham, West Yorkshire, England is an active Anglican parish church and Grade II* listed building in the Deanery of New Ainsty, the Archdeaconry of York and the Diocese of York. It is part of The Bramham Benefice, a group of four churches serving villages to the east of Wetherby in the LS23 postcode area. The current Priest in Charge is The Reverend Nicholas J. Morgan, MA.

History
The church originally dates from the 12th and 13th centuries; the earliest known parts were built around 1150. It was altered in the 19th and 20th centuries. The church contains various monuments to the Fox-Lane family of Bramham Park most notably George (1697-1773).

Architectural style
The church is built of magnesian limestone and has a pitched slate roof. The church has a tower to its western side with a spire atop. The tower has three offset stages, a round-headed window and clocks on the southern, northern and western face. The church has an ornate lychgate on the southern side of its boundaries.

See also
List of places of worship in the City of Leeds
Grade II* listed buildings in Leeds
Listed buildings in Bramham cum Oglethorpe

References

External links

All Saints' Church Bramham - A Church Near You
All Saints', Bramham - The Bramham Benefice

Churches in Leeds
Listed buildings in Leeds
Anglican Diocese of Leeds
Church of England church buildings in West Yorkshire
Grade II* listed churches in West Yorkshire